{{DISPLAYTITLE:C11H9I3N2O4}}
The molecular formula C11H9I3N2O4 (molar mass: 613.914 g/mol, exact mass: 613.7697 u) may refer to:

 Diatrizoate
 Iotalamic acid